Pandemonium is the second greatest hits compilation album from Taiwanese black metal band Chthonic. It features eleven tracks from eleven years of band history (1996 – 2007). It follows A Decade on the Throne, a live album and DVD intended for the Asian market.

A Decade on the Throne and Pandemonium are identical with regards to the track listings, up to a total of nine songs. For Pandemonium, however, seven tracks were re-recorded with the band's main drummer Dani, who, after an injury during a live show in 2005, was replaced by Reno Killerich for the recording of Seediq Bale. At the time of the release of Pandemonium, the band toured Europe and the U.S., spreading their message of an independent Taiwan that wants to contribute to international society regardless of Chinese oppression.

Track listing 

Track 5 combines "Mother Isle Disintegrated, Aboriginal Gods Enthroned" from Where the Ancestors' Souls Gathered with "Mother Isle Disintegrated, Aboriginal Gods Enthroned (Chapter 2)" from 9th Empyrean.

Personnel 
 Freddy Lim a.k.a. Freddy, Left Face of Maradou – lead vocals
 Jesse Liu a.k.a. Jesse, the Infernal – lead guitar, rhythm guitar, acoustic guitars
 Doris Yeh a.k.a. Doris, Thunder Tears – bass guitar, backing vocals
 Dani Wang a.k.a. Dani, the Azathothian Hands – drums, percussion
 CJ, Dispersed Fingers – keyboards, synth, piano
 Su-Nung, the Bloody String – erhu

References

Chthonic (band) albums
2008 compilation albums
SPV/Steamhammer compilation albums